Hans Beham may refer to:

 Hans Sebald Beham (1500–1550), engraver, designer of woodcuts, painter and miniaturist born in Nuremberg
 Hans Beham, also of Nuremberg, who cast the Sigismund Bell in 1520, for the Wawel castle, Poland